Canal 3 is the first commercial TV station and the second overall station in Guatemala. It began its TV service in 1956.

Its programming broadcasts its own productions and telenovelas, among other international productions. It is owned by Grupo Chapín TV, a subsidiary of Remigio Ángel González's Albavisión group.

History

On May 15, 1956, Channel 3 began broadcasting and became the first private station in Central America. Its first studio was located in the 8th. avenue and 9th. Zone 1 street, and its antenna was located in the city center. In 1961 the studio was destroyed after a fire, forcing the channel to be off the air for a few months. Later, it moved its facilities to a location in Las Majadas, zone 11.

The channel is considered pioneer of television, as it was the first to make live broadcasts from mobile units and in color broadcasting. It was the fourth country in Latin America to do so, after Mexico, Cuba and Puerto Rico.

In 1968, the Canal 3 facility was looted. On February 4, 1976, it suffered material losses from a 7.5 magnitude earthquake.

In the 1980s, it incorporated stereo sound, but in 1982 the government of Efrain Rios Montt gave the order to close the channel for about a month. In 1988, Canal 3 and Televisiete were sold to Televisa.

In 1990, it began broadcasting 24 hours a day.

In 1992, both channels were sold to Miami-based television corporation Albavisión.

The station made its first broadcasts in high definition during World Cup Germany 2006 experimentally on Channel 19 of the band UHF.

In 2015, the group Grupo Chapín TV was created, along with its sister channels.

Controversies

On June 2, 2016, the International Commission Against Impunity in Guatemala and Public Prosecutor's Office announced the State Cooperation Case in Guatemala State Co-optation. According to the investigations, in 2008, Otto Pérez Molina, general secretary of the Patriotic Party, was shaping up as the presidential candidate. Because his party needed funds, a group of companies controlled by Roxana Baldetti was used to receive illicit money, including Comercial Urma, Publicmer, Publiases and Serpumer. These entities began receiving money from Guatemala Radio and Television and Televisiete.

As the campaign progressed, channels increased payments to the four companies to the sum of Q17 679 200.00. Monthly, two payments were recorded for Q215 600.00, one for each channel. Both television stations benefited from million-dollar contracts after the new government took office in 2012.

Payments were not reported to the Supreme Electoral Court and were used to purchase new vehicles: ten trucks, one bus and five vans, which were used in the Patriot Party's presidential campaign.

References

 http://www.cicig.org/index.php?mact-News,cntnt01,detail,0&cntnt01articleid-723&cntnt01returnid-TM 67-videos-title-Cooptation of the State of Guatemala-website-International Commission Against Impunity in Guatemala-location-Guatemala-date-June 2, 2016-date-June 2, 2016

Television channels and stations established in 1956
Television stations in Guatemala